The history of the Delft University of Technology started in the year 1842 with the foundation of the Royal Academy (1842–1864). The Royal Academy restarted in 1864 as the Polytechnic School (1864–1905), which evolved the Delft University of Technology in 1905.

History

Royal Academy (1842–1864)

Delft University of Technology was founded on January 8, 1842 by King William II of the Netherlands as Royal Academy for the education of civilian engineers, for serving both nation and industry, and of apprentices for trade.

One of the purposes of the academy was to educate civil servants for the colonies of the Dutch East India Company. The first director of the academy was Antoine Lipkens, constructor of the first Dutch optical telegraph, called simply as Lipkens. Royal Academy had its first building located at Oude Delft 95 Street in Delft. On May 23, 1863 an Act was passed imposing regulations on technical education in the Netherlands, bringing it under the rules of secondary education.

Polytechnic School (1864–1905)

On June 20, 1864 Royal Academy in Delft was disbanded by a Royal Decree, giving a way to a Polytechnic School of Delft. The newly formed school educated engineers of various fields and architects, so much needed during the rapid industrialization period in the 19th century.

Institute of Technology (1905-1986)

Yet another Act, passed on May 22, 1905, changed the name of the school to Technische College (Institute) of Delft, emphasizing the academic quality of the education. Polytechnic was granted university rights and was allowed to award academic degrees.

The number of students reached 450 around that time. The official opening of the new school was attended by Queen Wilhelmina of the Netherlands on July 10, 1905. First dean of the newly established College was the hydraulic engineer Jacob Kraus. Corporate rights were granted to the College on June 7, 1956. Most of the university buildings during that time were located within Delft city center, with some of the buildings set on the side of the river Schie, in the Wippolder district.

Student societies grew together with the university. On March 22, 1848 the first student union, Delftsch Studenten Corps was established, becoming the third corporal student society after Vindicat and Minerva in Groningen and Leiden respectively. In 1917 Proof Garden for Technical Plantation was established by Gerrit van Iterson, which today is known as Botanical Garden of TU Delft. In that period a first female professor, Toos Korvezee, was appointed.

Delft University of Technology (1986-present)

After the end of the Second World War, TU Delft increased its rapid academic expansion. Studium Generale was established at all universities in the Netherlands, including TU Delft, to promote a free and accessible knowledge related to culture, technology, society and science. Because of the increasing number of students, in 1974 the first Reception Week for First Year Students was established, which became a TU Delft tradition since then.

On September 1, 1986 Delft Institute of Technology officially changed its name to Delft University of Technology, underlining the quality of the education and research provided by the institution. In the course of further expansion, in 1987 Delft Top Tech institute was established, which provided a professional master education in management for people working in the technology-related companies. On September 1, 1997 13 faculties of TU Delft were merged into 9, providing better efficiency in management of the increasing in size university. In the early 90s, because of an overwhelming outnumbering of female students by men, an initiative to increase the number of women studying at the university resulted in founding a separate emancipation commission at TU Delft. As a result, Girls Study Technology  days were established. In later years the responsibilities of the commission were distributed over multiple institutes.

Since 2006 all buildings of the university are placed outside of the historical city center of Delft. Relatively new building of Material Sciences department was sold, later demolished in 2007, to give place for a newly built building of the Haagse Hogeschool. Closer cooperation between TU Delft and Dutch universities of applied sciences resulted in physical transition of some of the institutes  to Delft. In September 2009 many institutes of applied sciences from the Hague region as well as Institute of Applied Sciences in Rijswijk, transferred to Delft, close to the location of the university, at the square between Rotterdamseweg street and Leeghwaterstraat street.

 
In the morning of May 13, 2008 a fire started in the main building of the Faculty of Architecture. The fire soon engulfed several floors of the southern wing of the building. As fire fighters struggled to control the blaze, the fire spread throughout the building which had been evacuated when the first fire alarm went off. The damage to the building proved to be extensive. Parts of the northern wing had collapsed and it was feared that the rest of the building would follow. However, the library, considered to be one of the finest in Europe and containing several thousands of books, was undamaged. This collection also included rare maps and cartography dating to the 17th Century. Delft University employed specialists to remove the books and materials due to the structural instability of the building, and as of July 4, it has been confirmed that these books and maps have been safely removed and show no signs of damage. This is believed to be due to the fact that the fire spread upwards from the 6th Floor, whereas the library was located on the ground floor. Firefighters were also able to save the historic models and furniture, including chairs by Gerrit Rietveld and Le Corbusier. The Architecture building has been completely demolished. The former main building of the TU Delft is now used to house the faculty. It is believed the fire was started by a ruptured water pipe which short circuited a coffee machine on the 6th floor of the building.

2007 marks the moment when three Dutch technical universities, TU Delft, TU Eindhoven and University of Twente, established a federation, called 3TU.

TU Delft logo

Through the course of the years the logo of TU Delft changed, as its official name did. The current logo is based on three official university colors cyan, black and white. Letter T bearers on top a stylized flame, remembering the flame that Prometheus brought from Mount Olympus to the people, against Zeus's will. Prometheus, is sometimes considered as the first ever engineer, since he brought the knowledge to mortals about fire which they did not possess, and is an important symbol for the university. Its statue stands in the center of the newly renovated TU Delft campus, Mekelpark.

Archival videos from TU Delft History (in Dutch)

References 

Delft University of Technology
Delft University of Technology
Delft University of Technology
Articles containing video clips
Delft
Delft University of Technology